Graham v. Florida, 560 U.S. 48 (2010), was a decision by the Supreme Court of the United States holding that juvenile offenders cannot be sentenced to life imprisonment without parole for non-homicide offenses. 

In June 2012, in the related Miller v. Alabama, the Court ruled that mandatory sentences for life without parole for juvenile offenders, even in cases of murder, was cruel and unusual punishment in violation of the Eighth Amendment to the United States Constitution.

The case 

Terrance Jamar Graham (born January 6, 1987), along with two accomplices, attempted to rob a barbecue restaurant in Jacksonville, Florida in July 2003. Aged 16 at the time, Graham was arrested for the robbery attempt and was charged as an adult for armed burglary with assault and battery, as well as attempted armed robbery. The first charge was a first-degree felony that is punishable by life. He pleaded guilty and his plea was accepted.

Six months later, on December 2, 2004, Graham was arrested again for home invasion robbery. Though Graham denied involvement, he acknowledged that he was in violation of his plea agreement. In 2006, the presiding judge sentenced Graham to life in prison. Because Florida abolished parole, it became effectively a life sentence without parole.

Majority opinion 

Justice Kennedy delivered the opinion of the Court:

Implications 
According to a May 2010 Catholic News Service article, thirty-seven states, the District of Columbia, and the federal government have statutes that allow for a possible sentence of life in prison without parole for non-homicide crimes. However, only some of those jurisdictions have persons serving those sentences for non-homicide crimes, and most of those are adults. According to Justice Anthony M. Kennedy in May 2010, 129 people are serving non-parole life sentences for non-homicide crimes which they committed as juveniles, 77 in Florida and the rest held in 10 different states.

The ruling was declared retroactive to cases on collateral review as a "new rule of substantive constitutional law" by the 7th Judicial District Court in Scott County, Iowa, in the case of State v. Jason Means. Means was aged 17 when he was involved in a 1993 kidnapping and homicide. Following a jury trial, Means was convicted of kidnapping and second degree murder. Thereafter, Means was sentenced to life without parole on the kidnapping charge and 90 years consecutive on the second-degree murder and other related charges.

Means challenged his life sentence under Iowa Rule of Criminal Procedure 2.24(5) with the assistance of attorney Angela Fritz Reyes. On September 30, 2010, the district court issued an opinion declaring Graham retroactive. The court re-sentenced Means in absentia to life imprisonment and severed the non-parole portion of Iowa law, thereby granting Means the opportunity for parole.

In at least two cases, state high courts have ruled that life without parole is still appropriate for homicides, no matter what age the defendant. On December 21, 2010, the Supreme Court of Missouri delivered its opinion in the case of State v. Anthony Andrews, affirming a sentence of life imprisonment without parole in a case in which the defendant, Andrews, was a juvenile convicted of first-degree murder. The Wisconsin Supreme Court on May 20, 2011, ruled similarly in State v. Omer Ninham, in a case in which Ninham was convicted as an adult of intentional homicide for a crime committed at the age of 14.

Further developments
In February 2012, Terrance Jamar Graham was re-sentenced by the original trial judge to a 25-year sentence and set to be released on August 16, 2025.

In March 2012, the Court heard arguments in the case of Miller v. Alabama, concerning the constitutionality of mandatory life without parole sentences for juvenile offenders in cases including murder. The Court issued its ruling on June 25, 2012, striking down the mandatory sentences as cruel and unusual punishments in violation of the Eighth Amendment to the United States Constitution.

Graham is currently incarcerated in the Charlotte Correctional Institution.

References

Further reading
.
.
.

External links
 

United States Supreme Court cases
United States Supreme Court cases of the Roberts Court
2010 in United States case law
Life imprisonment
Cruel and Unusual Punishment Clause case law
United States children's rights case law